Buren refers to both a municipality and a town in the Betuwe region of the Netherlands.

Buren may also refer to:
 Buren, Friesland
 County of Buren

See also
 Van Buren (disambiguation)
 Beuren (disambiguation)
 Büren (disambiguation)
 Burren (disambiguation)